Kosteltsevo is a rural locality and the administrative center of Kosteltsevsky Selsoviet Rural Settlement, Kurchatovsky District, Kursk Oblast, Russia. Population:

Geography 
The village is located on the Prutishche River in the basin of the Seym, 73 km from the Russia–Ukraine border, 45 km north-west of Kursk, 19.5 km north-west of the district center – the town Kurchatov.

 Climate
Kosteltsevo has a warm-summer humid continental climate (Dfb in the Köppen climate classification).

Transport 

The rural locality is situated 51 km from Kursk Vostochny Airport, 149 km from Belgorod International Airport and 254 km from Voronezh Peter the Great Airport.

References

Notes

Sources

Rural localities in Kurchatovsky District, Kursk Oblast